Neo are a jazz and progressive rock band from Italy formed in 2005. They have received many positive reviews in the press, and their next album is being produced by Steve Albini.

Members
 drummer Antonio Zitarelli
 tenor saxophonist Carlo Conti
 guitarist Manlio Maresca

Discography
 2009 - Water Resistance

References

Italian jazz ensembles
Italian progressive rock groups
2005 establishments in Italy
Musical groups established in 2005